HC Diavoli Rossoneri Milano was an ice hockey team in Milan, Italy. They played in the Serie A, the top level of ice hockey in Italy.

History
The club was founded in 1933 and won their first of four Serie A championships in 1935. They also won the Spengler Cup three times, the first of them being in 1934.

They merged with HC Milano in 1937, a merger which lasted until 1941.

After World War II the club became independent again. This lasted until 1956, when financial problems forced another merger with HC Milano.

Achievements

Serie A champion (4): 1935, 1936, 1949, 1953.
Serie A runner-up (3): 1937, 1947, 1952.
Spengler Cup champion (3): 1934, 1935, 1950.
Basler Cup champion (1): 1950.

References

External links
 Federazione Italiana Sport del Ghiaccio, Hockey 
 Hockeytime.net

Defunct ice hockey teams in Italy
Ice hockey clubs established in 1933
Sports clubs disestablished in 1956
1933 establishments in Italy
1956 disestablishments in Italy
Sport in Milan